The Foxdale River is a river of the Isle of Man which rises east of the South Barrule and flows 5 km north through Foxdale to join the River Neb at St John's.

References

Rivers of the Isle of Man